In a Heartbeat is a 2017 computer-animated short film produced by Ringling College of Art and Design. Written and directed by Esteban Bravo and Beth David, the project was funded through Kickstarter, raising $14,191 from 416 backers on a goal of $3,000. The short film concerns a closeted gay boy, Sherwin who has a crush on another boy named Jonathan and his heart desires to be with him. The short received wide praise on various platforms and was shortlisted for an Academy Award for Best Animated Short Film.

Plot
Sherwin, a shy ginger haired boy, arrives at school awaiting the arrival of his secret crush, Jonathan. Sherwin hides in a tree and watches as Jonathan walks by reading a book and playing with an apple. Suddenly, Sherwin's heart begins to beat rapidly and becomes anthropomorphic, leaving his body and chasing after Jonathan. Sherwin attempts to grab and hide his heart, resulting in various awkward encounters with Jonathan. Eventually, Sherwin chases his heart inside the school and grabs it. Then the heart grabs Jonathan's finger. The situation becomes uncomfortable as other students see the two and look on in confusion. The heart breaks in two and Sherwin runs away with one half. Outside the school, Sherwin cries silently when Jonathan walks up and sits next to him. They hold their hands together as they join the heart back together and it happily springs to life. The scene fades to black with Sherwin and Jonathan's hearts glowing and then forming into one.

Production
Production on the short started in January 2016, when Esteban Bravo and Beth David began working on their senior thesis at Ringling College of Art and Design. The initial pitch featured a boy and a girl, but at the last minute they decided to switch it to a same-sex couple in order to make the story feel "more personal". They made a Kickstarter page in November 2016 to complete the film and earned more than enough of the requested amount. A trailer was released on May 17, 2017 and the short film was released on July 31, 2017.

Reception
The short film received overwhelmingly universal praise for its animation, positive message and emotional resonance. The short film blew up on YouTube, with an estimated 42 million views, and has been passed on through Facebook and Twitter. Reaction videos were posted by Fine Brothers Entertainment, Ellen DeGeneres and Connor Franta. It was later named  9 on YouTube's list of the top 10 trending videos of 2017.

Awards
Since its launch, the film has received numerous awards and has been shown at numerous LGBT events and film festivals. It got shortlisted at the Academy Awards for Best Animated Short Film, but did not get a nomination. The short was also included in The Animation Showcase 2017 world touring screening that premiered it in London 25 July 2017 in Soho House.

References

External links

2017 films
2017 3D films
2017 computer-animated films
2010s American animated films
2010s animated short films
American animated short films
Animated films without speech
Kickstarter-funded films
American LGBT-related short films
LGBT-related animated films
2017 LGBT-related films
Gay-related films
3D short films
2017 YouTube videos
Student Academy Award winners
American student films
2010s English-language films
Films released on YouTube